Following is a sortable list of films produced in Italy in 1963.

See also

1963 in film

References

Footnotes

Sources

External links
Italian films of 1963 at the Internet Movie Database

Lists of 1963 films by country or language
1963
Films